The Mission sui juris of I-li was a pre-diocesan Latin Church ecclesiastical jurisdiction or mission sui iuris of the Catholic Church in Mongol-imperial China, notably in (mostly Muslim) East Turkestan.

History 
 In 1320, the jurisdiction has been established as Diocese of Ili-baluc,  alias Almaliq, alias Kuldja, on pagan territory split off from the Archdiocese of Khanbalik 汗八里, in the Great Khan's Mongol-Chinese capital; no incumbent available, but it was suppressed in 1330.

 Modern missions in the region, now known as Xinjiang (= Sinkiang), were mounted by the Scheutists from their neighboring Apostolic Vicariate of Kansu (now Archdiocese of Lanzhou), under its authority.
 On 1 October 1888, the Ili see was restored, albeit demoted as lowest-ranking pre-diocesan missionary jurisdiction: Mission sui juris of I-li 伊犁, alias Kuldja, alias Yining 伊寧.
 It was again suppressed on 8 March 1922 by Pius XI's papal brief (breve) Apostolatus officium, incorporating its territory in the Apostolic Vicariate of Western Kansu (the former Kansu; two year later renamed Lanchowfu).

 Heritage
However its territory would soon see a new missionary see, the present Apostolic Prefecture of Xinjiang-Urumqi, confided to the Divine Word Missionaries on 14 February 1930 as Mission sui juris of Xinjiang.

Ordinaries 
It has had only three Ecclesiastical Superiors, all members of the Scheutists (C.I.C.M.), from the Low Countries :
 Daniel Bernard van Koot, C.I.C.M. (1888 - 1893)
 Jan Baptist Steeneman, C.I.C.M. (Dutch; 1898 – death 1918)
 Joseph Hoogers (高東升), C.I.C.M. (Belgian; 1918.06.08 – 1922), later Apostolic Prefect of Datongfu 大同府 (China) (1923.03.03 – 1931.09.28).

References

Source and external links 
 GigaCatholic 
 Bibliography
 Joseph de Moidrey, La hiérarchie catholique en Chine, en Corée et au Japon (1307–1914), Shanghai 1914, p. 94.
 Breve Decet Romanum Pontificem, AAS 22 (1930), p. 478.

Missions sui iuris
Former Roman Catholic dioceses in China
1898 establishments in China